Joseph Cooke (born 15 February 1955) is a retired Dominican professional footballer who spent his entire career in England. He began his career at as a centre-forward, but was later converted into a central defender.

Career
Beginning at Bradford City, Cooke also played for Peterborough United, Oxford United, Exeter City, Rochdale and Wrexham.

Personal life
His sister is children's author and Playdays presenter Trish Cooke.

References

External links
Post War English & Scottish Football League A - Z Player's Transfer Database
Cooke's statistics at Oxford United from Rage Online

1955 births
Living people
Bradford City A.F.C. players
Peterborough United F.C. players
Oxford United F.C. players
Exeter City F.C. players
Rochdale A.F.C. players
Wrexham A.F.C. players
English Football League players
Dominica footballers
Association football forwards
Association football central defenders